The A. T. Ranch Headquarters, in Wheeler County, Nebraska near Bartlett, Nebraska, has historic significance dating to 1906.  Also known as The Headquarters and denoted as WH00-19, it was listed on the National Register of Historic Places in 1990.  The listing included two contributing buildings and one other contributing structure.  The main building at this rural site is a two-story house built in 1906 from concrete blocks formed at the site.  The building is in Renaissance Revival style.

It was deemed significant as an "excellent example" of Renaissance Revival style and as the most important artifact remaining from what was once a  ranch.

References

External links 

Historic stereoscopic photograph Nebraska Memories

Historic districts on the National Register of Historic Places in Nebraska
Renaissance Revival architecture in Nebraska
Buildings and structures completed in 1906
Buildings and structures in Wheeler County, Nebraska
Ranches in Nebraska
National Register of Historic Places in Wheeler County, Nebraska
1906 establishments in Nebraska